These are the results of the diving competition at the 1994 World Aquatics Championships, which took place in Rome, Italy.

Medal table

Medal summary

Men

Women

1994 World Aquatics Championships
Diving at the World Aquatics Championships